The Izvorul Dragoș is a left tributary of the river Vișeu in Romania. It discharges into the Vișeu near Moisei.

References

Rivers of Romania
Rivers of Maramureș County